Don't Explain may refer to:

 "Don't Explain" (song), a 1944 song written by Billie Holiday and Arthur Herzog Jr.
 Don't Explain (Robert Palmer album), a 1990 album by Robert Palmer
 Don't Explain (Joel Frahm album), a 2001 album by Joel Frahm
 Don't Explain (Beth Hart and Joe Bonamassa album), a 2011 album by Beth Hart and Joe Bonamassa
 Don't Explain (DVD), a 2007 sketch comedy act by The Umbilical Brothers